Tabinet may refer to:

Poplin, a type of fabric
Tablanet, a card game